The 2004 WDF Europe Cup was the 14th edition of the WDF Europe Cup darts tournament, organised by the World Darts Federation. It was held in Tampere, Finland from 27 Aug-30 Aug.



Entered teams

21 countries/associations entered a men's selection in the event.

20 countries/associations entered a women's selection in the event.

Men's singles

Men's Pairs

Men's team
Round Robin 

Group A

 Sweden 9 - 8  Scotland
 Sweden 9 - 4  Ireland
 Sweden 9 - 3  Hungary
 Sweden 9 - 2  Russia
 Scotland 9 - 4  Hungary
 Scotland 9 - 4  Russia
 Ireland 9 - 7  Scotland
 Ireland 9 - 3  Russia
 Hungary 9 - 8  Ireland
 Hungary 9 - 5  Russia
Group B

 England 9 - 6  Wales
 England 9 - 4  Germany 
 England 9 - 0  Greece
 England 9 - 6  France
 Wales 9 - 3  Germany 
 Wales 9 - 2  Greece 
 Wales 9 - 2  France
 Germany 9 - 3  Greece 
 Germany 9 - 3  France
 Greece 9 - 5  France

Group C

 Netherlands 9 - 7  Norway 
 Netherlands 9 - 3  Northern Ireland 
 Netherlands 9 - 3  Switzerland
 Netherlands 9 - 6  Italy
 Netherlands 9 - 0  Estonia
 Norway 9 - 5  Northern Ireland  
 Norway 9 - 2  Switzerland
 Norway 9 - 8  Italy 
 Norway 9 - 2  Estonia
 Northern Ireland 9 - 2  Switzerland
 Northern Ireland 9 - 5  Italy
 Northern Ireland 9 - 1  Estonia
 Switzerland 9 - 8  Italy
 Switzerland 9 - 3  Estonia
 Italy 9 - 3  Estonia

Group D

 Belgium 9 - 7  Finland
 Belgium 9 - 6  Denmark
 Belgium 9 - 7  Gibraltar
 Belgium 9 - 3  Austria
 Finland 9 - 2  Denmark
 Finland 9 - 1  Gibraltar
 Finland 9 - 1  Austria
 Denmark 9 - 4  Gibraltar
 Denmark 9 - 1  Austria
 Gibraltar 9 - 6  Austria 

Knock Out

Women's singles

Women's Pairs
Round Robin 

Group A

 Karin Krappen & Francis Hoenselaar 4 - 2  Nicola McKenna & Maureen Kelly
 Karin Krappen & Francis Hoenselaar 4 - 3  Anne Kirk & Louise Hepburn
 Karin Krappen & Francis Hoenselaar 4 - 0  Reili Roodla & Triin Timmermann
 Karin Krappen & Francis Hoenselaar 4 - 0  Judith Walkner & Marion Petschenig
 Nicola McKenna & Maureen Kelly 4 - 2  Anne Kirk & Louise Hepburn
 Nicola McKenna & Maureen Kelly 4 - 0  Reili Roodla & Triin Timmermann
 Nicola McKenna & Maureen Kelly 4 - 0  Judith Walkner & Marion Petschenig
 Anne Kirk & Louise Hepburn 4 - 2  Reili Roodla & Triin Timmermann
 Anne Kirk & Louise Hepburn 4 - 1  Judith Walkner & Marion Petschenig
 Reili Roodla & Triin Timmermann 4 - 0  Judith Walkner & Marion Petschenig
Group B

 Denise Cassidy & Grace Crane 4 - 3  Jan Robbins & Chris Savvery
 Denise Cassidy & Grace Crane 4 - 2  Nora Fekete & Adel Urgyan
 Denise Cassidy & Grace Crane 4 - 2  Marika Juhola & Tarja Salminen
 Denise Cassidy & Grace Crane 4 - 1  Nathalie Kallen & Barbara Guldimann
 Jan Robbins & Chris Savvery 4 - 2  Nora Fekete & Adel Urgyan
 Jan Robbins & Chris Savvery 4 - 1  Marika Juhola & Tarja Salminen
 Jan Robbins & Chris Savvery 4 - 0  Nathalie Kallen & Barbara Guldimann
 Nora Fekete & Adel Urgyan 4 - 0  Marika Juhola & Tarja Salminen
 Nora Fekete & Adel Urgyan 4 - 2  Nathalie Kallen & Barbara Guldimann
 Marika Juhola & Tarja Salminen 4 - 0  Nathalie Kallen & Barbara Guldimann

Group C

 Maud Jansson & Carina Ekberg 4 - 1  Chiara Bassega & Mojca Humar  
 Maud Jansson & Carina Ekberg 4 - 0  Valere Gaudion & Laetitia Glemin
 Maud Jansson & Carina Ekberg 4 - 0  Wendy Beutels & Christiane Soudan 
 Chiara Bassega & Mojca Humar 4 - 2  Olga Meyer & Anastasia Dobromyslova    
 Chiara Bassega & Mojca Humar 4 - 3  Valere Gaudion & Laetitia Glemin 
 Chiara Bassega & Mojca Humar 4 - 3  Wendy Beutels & Christiane Soudan
 Olga Meyer & Anastasia Dobromyslova 4 - 2  Maud Jansson & Carina Ekberg
 Olga Meyer & Anastasia Dobromyslova 4 - 1  Wendy Beutels & Christiane Soudan
 Valere Gaudion & Laetitia Glemin 4 - 3  Olga Meyer & Anastasia Dobromyslova     
 Wendy Beutels & Christiane Soudan 4 - 2  Valere Gaudion & Laetitia Glemin
Group D

 Trina Gulliver & Clare Bywaters 4 - 0  Mona Lund & Janni Larsen
 Trina Gulliver & Clare Bywaters 4 - 1  Hege Løkken & Tone Eriksen-Wagner
 Trina Gulliver & Clare Bywaters 4 - 0  Beatrix Krockel & Heike Ernst  
 Trina Gulliver & Clare Bywaters 4 - 0  Inita Bite & Ligita Vilks
 Mona Lund & Janni Larsen 4 - 2  Hege Løkken & Tone Eriksen-Wagner 
 Mona Lund & Janni Larsen 4 - 2  Beatrix Krockel & Heike Ernst
 Mona Lund & Janni Larsen 4 - 1  Inita Bite & Ligita Vilks
 Hege Løkken & Tone Eriksen-Wagner 4 - 3  Beatrix Krockel & Heike Ernst
 Hege Løkken & Tone Eriksen-Wagner 4 - 1  Inita Bite & Ligita Vilks   
 Beatrix Krockel & Heike Ernst 4 - 3  Inita Bite & Ligita Vilks

Knock Out

References

Darts tournaments